Billy Zoom (born Stuart Tyson Kindell; February 20, 1948) is an American guitarist, best known as one of the founders of the punk rock band X.

At 68 years old, Zoom was diagnosed in 2015 with an aggressive form of bladder cancer and began immediate treatment. He has since stated that he is "cancer-free" but will continue receiving chemotherapy treatments.

Early life
The son of a big band woodwinds player, Kindell began playing a variety of instruments, including violin, accordion, piano, clarinet, tenor, alto, and baritone saxophones, flute, banjo, and guitar.

Upon moving to Los Angeles in the 1960s, he worked as a session guitarist while attending technical school for training in electronics repair. He has an insider's reputation as an expert in the maintenance, restoration, and modification of vintage tube amplifiers and combo organs. He has performed custom technical work on the amps for a host of electric guitarists and bassists.

Zoom became a Christian around the time X started, having grown up in a secular household. While being a self-described conservative, Zoom has criticized American two-party system.

Career

After submitting a string of demos to every record label he could find under his name Ty Kindell, he chose his stage name to get attention from executives who may have already rejected him.

Although best known as guitarist and founding member of punk rock band X, Zoom has also worked with rockabilly legend Gene Vincent, the Blasters, Etta James, Big Joe Turner, Mike Ness, and dozens of other major recording artists. On stage, he is known for his wide-legged stance, big grin and tendency to make eye contact with audience members. He adopted this presence in reaction to many guitarists whose body histrionics and facial expressions gave the impression that they were playing very difficult parts on their instruments. Zoom wanted to make everything look easy.

In June 2008, in honor of his contributions to both the world music community and the legacy of Gretsch guitars, Gretsch unveiled the G6129BZ Billy Zoom Custom Shop Tribute Silver Jet.

References

External links

 

1948 births
Living people
American punk rock guitarists
American Christians
X (American band) members
The Blasters members
Guitarists from California
American rockabilly musicians
People from Savanna, Illinois
American male guitarists
20th-century American guitarists
Country musicians from California
Country musicians from Illinois
20th-century American male musicians